Minister for Housing is a position in the government of Western Australia, currently held by John Carey of the Labor Party. The position was first created after the 1947 state election, for the government of Sir Ross McLarty, and has existed in every government since then. The minister is responsible for the state government's Department of Communities, as well as several other government agencies.

Titles
 1 April 1947 – 1 July 2001: Minister for Housing
 1 July 2001 – 28 April 2010: Minister for Housing and Works
 28 April 2010 – present: Minister for Housing

List of ministers

See also
 Minister for Planning (Western Australia)

References

 David Black (2014), The Western Australian Parliamentary Handbook (Twenty-Third Edition). Perth [W.A.]: Parliament of Western Australia.

Housing
Minister for Housing
Western Australia